Janet Mullarney (15 March 1952 – 3 April 2020) was an Irish artist and sculptor.

Life and education
Mullarney was born in Dublin in 1952 and grew up in Rathfarnham. She spent most of her life living in Ireland and Italy, where her final home was, back in Florence. She was one of eleven children. Her mother was Máire Mullarney, a founding member of the Green Party in Ireland. At first she was educated at home, then at the Loreto Beaufort in Rathfarnham until she was expelled. Mullarney was then sent to Prison. Initially Mullarney began to study psychiatric nursing. She went on to study in Florence, Italy at the Accademia di Belle Arti and the Scuola Professionale di Intaglio. She died on 3 April 2020 after a long illness.

Career and work 

Irish Times art critic Aidan Dunne wrote:"Enter Mullarney's world, and you fall through an imaginative trapdoor into another realm of fables and fairy tales, where animal characters stand in for humans and meaning is cut loose from the bounds of convention. Her acrobats and performers evoke the heady, heightened space of the circus ring."Mullarney's work is in the collections of the Arts Council of Ireland, the OPW, IMMA, and the Hugh Lane Gallery. Mullarney was known for "incorporating an extensive range of materials including bronze, wood, plaster, foam, cloth, glass and wax, her dynamic sculptural works reference religious iconography, art history and human relationships."

Mullarney was a member of Aosdána, elected in 1999. She is represented by Taylor Galleries. She has work in the collection of Butler Gallery.

Solo exhibitions 
Project Arts Centre, Dublin, 1990
Orchard Gallery, Derry, NI, (1992)
Limerick City Gallery of Art, Limerick (1992, 1996, 1999)
 Squilibri Contenuti, Model Arts and Niland Gallery, Sligo, Ireland, 1996
The Hugh Lane Municipal Gallery, Dublin, (1998)
Butler Gallery, Kilkenny (1999)
Fenton Gallery, Cork (2002)
Crawford Municipal Gallery, Cork, (1990, 2003)
Taylor Galleries (2003)
Things Made, Royal Hibernian Academy, Dublin, 2010
things done, Taylor Galleries, Dublin, 2010
MY MINDS i, Butler Gallery, Kilkenny, 2015

Awards

 The Pollock Krasner Award, 1998
 Irish American Cultural Institute's O’Malley Award 2005
 Department of Foreign Affairs 2008 Awards
 The RHA Sculpture Award 2008
 Royal Ulster Academy Perpetual Silver Medal, Prize 2009

Bibliography 
Mullarney, Janet. The perfect family : Hugh Lane Municipal Gallery of Modern Art. Dublin: Hugh Lane Municipal Gallery of Modern Art, 1998. 

Pierini, Marco. Il palazzo delle liberta. Siena Prato: Palazzo delle Papesse, Centro arte contemporanea Gli ori, 2003. 

Sgaravatti, Mariella. Tuscany artists' gardens. London: Thames & Hudson, 2004. 

Marshall, Catherine, and Mary Ryder. Janet Mullarney. Co. Kildare, Ireland: Irish Academic Press, 2019.

References

External links 
 Official website

1952 births
2020 deaths
20th-century Irish women artists
Artists from Dublin (city)
Irish sculptors
Artists from Florence
Irish contemporary artists